The Ginetta G58 is a sports prototype developed by British car constructor Ginetta Cars. It is a development of its predecessors, the G57 P2, and the Ginetta-Juno P3-15, and can be built up from its predecessors. The car won on its race debut in 2018, at the Silverstone 12 Hours, the 4th race of the 2018 24H Proto Series.

Development 
The car is a further development of the Ginetta-Juno P3-15, and the Ginetta G57 P2, and has 30% more downforce compared to its predecessors, and a more powerful in house engine, replacing the Chevrolet LS3 6.2L V8, producing 575bhp. The car also has a top speed of 306km/h. Unlike its predecessors, it was not solely envisioned as a racecar, but also as a track-day car for enthusiasts and amateurs alike.  As such, it has features that were lacking on its predecessors, such as an enhanced cooling pack with air-conditioning, Anti-Lock Braking System (ABS) and a 2nd Passenger seat.  The car was launched at Autosport International 2018, on 15 January 2018, alongside the G60-LT-P1 LMP1 Prototype.

Competition history 
The car had its competition debut at the inaugural 12 Hours of Silverstone, as part of the 24H Proto Series. The #4 car entered by the Simpson Motorsport team, and piloted by Ginetta factory drivers Mike Simpson and Charlie Robertson, as well as Steve Tandy and Bob Berridge scored both Pole Position and the Overall Win. The car will be eligible in the P2 class of the Creventic 24H Proto Series, as well as the V de V Endurance Series.

References List 

Ginetta vehicles
Racing cars
Mid-engined cars
Cars introduced in 2018
